Patriarch Jovan may refer to:

Jovan I, Patriarch of the Serbs (1508)
Jovan II, Patriarch of the Serbs (1592–1613)